Alastoroides is a genus of potter wasps.

References

Potter wasps